Beavertown is the name of several places in the U.S. state of Pennsylvania, including:

 Beavertown, Blair County, Pennsylvania, a census-designated place
 Beavertown, Snyder County, Pennsylvania, a borough